Electric Loco Shed, Lallaguda is a motive power depot performing locomotive maintenance and repair facility for electric locomotives of the Indian Railways, located at Lallaguda of the South Central Railway zone in Telangana, India.

Locomotives

References

Lallaguda
Hyderabad district, India
1995 establishments in Andhra Pradesh
Rail transport in Telangana